Romy Rosemont (born October 28, 1964) is an American actress, who has appeared in multiple television series, including Shark, Grey's Anatomy, CSI: Crime Scene Investigation, Prison Break, and Private Practice. She got her break in 2010, playing Carole Hudson in the musical series Glee. Rosemont is married to fellow actor Stephen Root; the couple appeared on-screen together in a fourth-season episode of Fringe titled "And Those We've Left Behind".

Career
Rosemont is a graduate of Northwestern University. Rosemont has had guest and recurring roles in various television series, including alongside James Woods and Danielle Panabaker in Shark, as well as in Cook-Off!, Boston Legal, Crossing Jordan, Friends with Money, Back to You and Me, Close to Home, Grey's Anatomy, Friends, Shopgirl, Ghost Whisperer, CSI: Crime Scene Investigation, Prison Break, Castle and Drop Dead Diva. She played Lizzie Sparks in episode 16, season 6 of the TV show Criminal Minds.

As of 2009, Rosemont has appeared in musical comedy-drama Glee as recurring character Carole Hudson, the on-screen mother of Finn Hudson, played by Cory Monteith. In an interview in April 2011, she was enthusiastic about continuing her role in the series, saying "It's a great storyline, and it's going further, but there are so many people to accommodate. But hopefully these characters will grow and even the public and whatever will want to see more of them, so hopefully that will be it." In 2014, she appeared in three episodes of The Fosters.

Personal life
Rosemont has been married to actor Stephen Root since December 14, 2008. They both appeared in a 2011 episode of Fringe and a 2016 episode of Masters of Sex. The couple were due to appear on-screen together in the 2011 horror film Red State, but Rosemont was forced to pull out due to a scheduling conflict with Glee.

Filmography

Film

Television

References

External links

Place of birth missing (living people)
1964 births
American television actresses
Living people
Northwestern University alumni
21st-century American women